Rede de Emissoras Independentes (in English: Independent Broadcasters Network) or REI, was a Brazilian television network founded in 1969, as successor to the "Emissoras Unidas". Inaugurated on September 14, 1969, it was a network initially led by TV Record (São Paulo), TV Rio (Rio de Janeiro) and TV Alvorada (Brasilia); after 1976, it was led by TV Record of São Paulo and TVS of Rio de Janeiro. It was the largest television network in Brazil, currently the Globo Network.

See also 
 SBT
 RecordTV Rio

References 

Mass media in Rio de Janeiro (city)
Mass media in São Paulo
Television channels and stations established in 1969
1969 establishments in Brazil
Television channels and stations disestablished in 1989
1989 disestablishments in Brazil
Defunct television channels in Brazil
RecordTV